Many software programs are available for each discipline of civil engineering.  Most civil engineers practice in specialized subsets of civil engineering, such as geotechnical engineering, structural engineering, transportation engineering, hydraulic engineering, environmental engineering, project and construction management and land surveying.

Early history

The trend to implement software programs into the civil engineering industry began as educational concerns for the future as civil engineering prepared to enter the twenty-first century.  Today, these concerns and trends are centered on the continuing education unit which have become required as part of maintaining the professional license.  As a result of the expanding use and demand for these software programs, there was less of a necessity for occupations such as draftsman, because the engineer began to prepare and input the design parameters into the program, thus eliminating the need for manual drafting.  Land surveying, a specialized subset of civil engineering, relies heavily on the computerization of the industry.  University textbooks have already since begun to include software applications for students to gain experience with some kind of software interface.

Infrastructure design

Another specific subset, infrastructure design, relies heavily on estimates of load, pressure, drainage and flow.   Some software houses have attempted to provide design software catering for the variety of infrastructure design fields in an integrated manner.  However, general-purpose software may be used in the same manner at a fraction of the cost of design software. When planning the construction phase, various project management methods are used to estimate factors such as cost, schedule and resourcing. Different software packages rely on different formulas and theories as the basis for these calculations. Consulting engineers also take advantage of the insight software can provide as far as crossing services are concerned. A road design may have to accommodate the presence of underground pipes for example.  Civil Designer is an example of a design package which forms an integrated data gathering, drawing, surface modeling and design system for civil engineering infrastructure.

Maintenance

Another aspect of software programs utilized by civil engineers is not only for the use of designing site infrastructure, but also to maintain it.  As recent as 2011, there are programs available which allow the engineer to monitor bridges for cracks and settlements, as well as water distribution networks for failing subsurface pipes through the use of sensors installed.  This has created the ability for the engineer to eliminate some of the costs and liabilities associated with human inspectors.

Hydraulic engineering
Hydraulic engineering as a sub-discipline of civil engineering is concerned with the flow and conveyance of fluids, principally water and sewage. One feature of these systems is the extensive use of gravity as the motive force to cause the movement of the fluids. This area of civil engineering is intimately related to the design of bridges, dams, channels, canals, and levees, and to both sanitary and environmental engineering.

See also
Computer-aided design
Project management software
Geographic information system

References

External links
 Geotechnical & Geoenvironmental Software Directory

Computer-aided engineering
Civil engineering